Panruti railway station (code: PRT) is a railway station serving the town of Panruti in Tamil Nadu, India.

The station is a part of the Tiruchirapalli railway division of the Southern Railway zone and connects the city to various parts of the state as well as the rest of the country.

Location and layout
The railway station is located off the NH 45C, Thanjavur–Vikravanti National Highway of Panruti.

Lines

 BG single line towards  via , .

References

External links 
 Southern Railways - Official Website

Trichy railway division
Railway stations in Cuddalore district